Loricaria apeltogaster is a species of catfish in the family Loricariidae. It is native to South America, where it occurs in the drainage basins of the Paraguay River, the Paraná River, and the Uruguay River in Argentina, Brazil, Paraguay, and Uruguay. The species reaches 32.4 cm (12.8 inches) in standard length and is believed to be a facultative air-breather.

References 

Fish described in 1895
Loricariini